Susan Robinson Fruchtl is the former athletic director at Saint Francis University.

College
Susan Robinson graduated in 1992 from Penn State University with a B.S. in exercise and sports science. In 1992, she was named a consensus All-American and won the Wade Trophy as the best women's college basketball player in NCAA Division I, after previously winning Atlantic 10 Freshman-of-the-Year honors, twice being named to the All-Atlantic 10 Conference team, and chosen as the conference Player of the Year in 1991. Her 2,253 career points stood as a school record, until eclipsed in 2004.

Robinson Fruchtl holds a master's degree in higher education from Penn State.

Penn State statistics
Source

Coaching
Robinson Fruchtl served as an assistant coach at Penn State from 1993 to 1998, later rejoining the staff in May 2004. In June 2000, she became head girls' basketball coach at Beaver Area High School, ultimately leading the team to the PIAA Class AAA playoffs in her final two seasons.

Robinson Fruchtl was coach at Saint Francis from 2007 to 2012 with her 74 career wins tied for third on the school's list. She was named the 2011 NEC Coach of the Year.  She then served as the head women's basketball coach at Providence for four seasons.

Robinson Fruchtl returned to coaching the Red Flash during the 2018–19 season when Joe Haigh took a leave of absence on November 13, 2018 and continued in that role for the rest of the season following Haigh's resignation on February 1, 2019.

Administration
Robinson Fruchtl returned to Saint Francis University as Director of Athletics.

Family
She married Tony Fruchtl in 1997.

Head coaching record

See also
 List of NCAA Division I athletic directors

References

External links
 Saint Francis profile

Year of birth missing (living people)
Living people
All-American college women's basketball players
American women's basketball players
Penn State Lady Lions basketball coaches
Penn State Lady Lions basketball players
Providence Friars women's basketball coaches
Saint Francis Red Flash athletic directors
Saint Francis Red Flash women's basketball coaches
Women college athletic directors in the United States